ITP Aero (Industria de Turbo Propulsores) is a Spanish aero engine and gas turbine manufacturer. 

It was established in 1989 as a joint venture between Spanish engineering conglomerate SENER and Rolls-Royce Plc. By 2015, it had grown to become as the ninth largest aircraft engine and components manufacturing company in the world in terms of revenue; the firm is also ranked among the top one hundred companies in the aerospace industry.

ITP Aero includes among its activities the design, research and development, manufacturing and casting, assembly and testing of aeronautical engines. It also provides MRO services for a wide range of engines for regional airlines, business aviation, helicopters, industrial and defence applications. The company has a global network of production facilities in Spain, United Kingdom, Mexico, United States, Malta and India with over 3,500 employees. ITP Aero's headquarters are located in Zamudio, close to the city of Bilbao in Spain.

History
During 1989, Industria de Turbo Propulsores SA (ITP) was established. It was originally structured as a joint venture between Spanish engineering conglomerate SENER and British aero engine manufacturer Rolls-Royce Holdings. Its formation was closely associated with the creation of EuroJet Turbo GmbH, a multinational engine consortium to develop and produce the EJ200 turbojet engine to power the Eurofighter Typhoon.

In 1990, ITP acquired an engine maintenance plant located in Ajalvir, Madrid, from Spanish aircraft manufacturer Construcciones Aeronáuticas SA (CASA). During the following year, it launched engine component manufacturing activity at its plant in Zamudio, Bizkaia. In 1992, the company secured its first contract with Rolls-Royce, performing work on the Rolls-Royce Trent turbofan engine for civilian airliners such as the Airbus A330 and the Boeing 767.

During 1998, ITP began developing an international presence via its acquisition of a majority stake in Mexican engine specialist Turborreactores. In 2001, it created a new business unit dedicated to the Castings sector. By 2008, ITP had opened new overseas facilities in the United Kingdom, Malta and the United States.

Over time, ITP has participated in various international aero engine programmes in both the military and civil sectors. Accordingly, it has collaborated with companies such as Rolls-Royce, General Electric, Pratt & Whitney, SNECMA and Honeywell on such endeavours. The company has specialised in the manufacture and development of gas turbine components and modules. It also offers in-house support services, such as maintenance, repair and overhaul (MRO) activities and high value-added services on behalf of other engine manufacturers.

During the 2000s, ITP became involved in the production of the Europrop TP400, the largest turboprop engine developed in Europe, to power the Airbus A400M Atlas, a military transport plane. By this time, the firm was also engaged in multiple such collaborative defense aero engine programmes, such as EuroJet Turbo GmbH for the EJ200, and MTU Turbomeca Rolls-Royce for the MTR390.

By the mid-2010s, ITP had become the ninth largest aero engine and components manufacturing company in the world in terms of revenue, employing roughly 3,000 people around the globe. It has been closely involved with Rolls-Royce on the latter's Trent engine family, having acted as a key risk and revenue sharing partner on the programme in addition to applying various turbine-related technologies.

On 11 July 2016, Rolls-Royce Holdings announced that it was in the process of purchasing the outstanding 53.1% shareholding in the IPT joint venture in exchange for €720m. The deal was promoted as increasing Rolls-Royce's long-term aftermarket revenues, along with its stake in various defense-related manufacturing and services programmes, such as the EuroProp consortium that produce the TP400 engine. During December 2017, final approval from Spanish authorities was received for the takeover.

During June 2019, it was reported that Spanish technology group Indra Sistemas was engaging in discussions to purchase a minority stake in the company.

During October 2019, there was some political tensions over a decision by ITP Engines UK to refuse to issue a quote or trial version of its ESATAN-TMS CAD software to a researcher from Istanbul Technical University; this refusal was stated by the company to be in-line with recent sanctions that had been enacted upon Turkey by the UK government.

In September 2022, Rolls-Royce sold ITP Aero to American private equity firm Bain Capital, SAPA Placencia and JB Capital for 1700 million euros.

Major programmes

Civil 
Source: Industria de Turbo Propulsores

Engines for widebody aircraft 
 Trent 700
 Trent 800
 Trent 900
 Trent XWB
 Trent 1000
 Trent 7000

Engines for single aisle aircraft 
 Pure Power PW1000G

Engines for business aviation 
 Pure Power 800
 HTF7000
 TFE 731
 CFE 738

Industrial turbines 
 LMS100
 LM2500

Defence 
Source: ITP Aero
 Eurojet EJ200 (European consortium Eurojet Turbo GmbH) for Eurofighter Typhoon fighter aircraft.
 Europrop TP400 (European consortium EuroProp International) for Airbus A400M Atlas transport aircraft.
 General Electric CT7-8F5
 General Electric F414
 General Electric J85-5-21
 MTR MTR390-E (European consortium MTRI) for Eurocopter Tiger attack helicopter.

References

External links
 Official ITP website
 ITP Corporate Vídeo
 25 years of ITP
 Rolls-Royce venture to back UltraFan turbine research Flighglobal 15 JULY, 2015.
 Rolls-Royce venture to back UltraFan turbine research Flighglobal 15 JUNE, 2015.
 Pratt & Whitney Canada's Next-Generation PurePower® PW800 Engines Selected To Power Gulfstream's New Business Jet Family PR Newswire 14 OCTOBER, 2014.

Aircraft engine manufacturers of Spain
Gas turbine manufacturers